Sigli is an Indian village located in Dehradun Tehsil of Dehradun District.

Literacy
According to the 2011 Indian Census, literacy rate of Sigli village was 85.61 percent compared to 78.82 percent of Uttarakhand. The village's male literacy is 89.39 percent while female literacy rate was 82.59 percent.

References

Villages in Dehradun district